Bernard Knitter (born 28 February 1938) is a retired Polish wrestler. He competed in the Greco-Roman bantamweight division at the 1960 and 1964 Olympics, and won a bronze medal at the 1965 World Championships.

Knitter holds a degree in mechanical engineer from the Cracow University of Technology. In retirement he worked as a wrestling coach in Poland and later moved to Sweden. He is married and has a son.

References

1938 births
Living people
Olympic wrestlers of Poland
Wrestlers at the 1960 Summer Olympics
Wrestlers at the 1964 Summer Olympics
Polish male sport wrestlers
World Wrestling Championships medalists
People from Starogard County
Sportspeople from Pomeranian Voivodeship
People from Pomeranian Voivodeship (1919–1939)
20th-century Polish people
21st-century Polish people